ACAP may refer to:

In conservation:

 Agreement on the Conservation of Albatrosses and Petrels, a legally binding international treaty signed in 2001
 Arctic Council Action Plan, an action plan to eliminate pollution in the Arctic
 Annapurna Conservation Area Project, restricted area in Himalayas mountains, Nepal

In technology:

 Advanced Common Application Platform, a platform intended to provide television consumers with advanced interactive services
 Application Configuration Access Protocol, a protocol which enhances IMAP by allowing the user to set up data for universal access
 Automated Content Access Protocol, a proposed method of providing machine-readable DRM for online content

In other fields:

 Absorptive capacity, a term used within innovation management
 Advance Credit Administration Program, a series of college equivalent courses
 American Council on Alcohol Problems, a federation of 37 state affiliates promoting the reduction of alcohol advertising
 Array of Contemporary American Physicists, see American Institute of Physics
 Association for Community Affiliated Plans, a Medicaid health plan trade association 
 Australian College of Applied Psychology, a training organisation